Kevin M. Sampson (born June 19, 1981) is a former American football tackle. He was originally drafted by the Kansas City Chiefs in the seventh round (231st overall) of the 2004 NFL Draft.  He played college football at Syracuse.

Sampson has also been a member of the Carolina Panthers practice squad and of the Washington Redskins.

College career
Sampson played on the Syracuse football team for four years. In his freshman year, he started one game and played in six. During his Sophomore year, Sampson played in all 13 games that were scheduled but started in none. As a Junior, Sampson started al twelve games of the season on what finished as a 4-8 team. During his Senior year, the record of the football team improved to 6-6 and Sampson started in each and every game.  Overall, he played in 44 games (24 starts) for Syracuse University, blocking for a 1,000-yard rusher all four years.

Professional career

Kansas City Chiefs
Sampson debuted for the Chiefs during the 2004 season, during which he played in six games. In the next season, (2005) he made an appearance in four games and started in one. During the 2006 NFL season, Sampson played in six games and started in all of them.

Health issues
On Thursday, October 4, 2005, Sampson suffered a seizure at 10:00 AM.  Less than one week after coming off of his first start in the NFL, he was rushed into the emergency room, where he faded in and out of consciousness. Sampson fully recovered and went on to play football later in the season.

References

1981 births
Living people
American football offensive tackles
Carolina Panthers players
Kansas City Chiefs players
People from Westwood, New Jersey
Players of American football from New Jersey
Sportspeople from Bergen County, New Jersey
Syracuse Orange football players
Washington Redskins players
Westwood Regional High School alumni